Kim Hak-Chul (born 4 November 1972) is a South Korean retired footballer and football manager. He has played in the K League for 14 years from 1995 to 2009, and he has been rated by many fans as one of the best defenders in the K League.In 2009, he managed Incheon United reserve team and led the team to R-League Champion.

Club career

Busan Daewoo Royals

Kim Hak-chul signed Busan Daewoo Royals in 1995, but he played only seven games in the early stages.
Since 1996, he has been rated as a must-have player on the team. In 1997 he was rated as one of the K-League's best defenders and that year the Busan Daewoo Royals won the Adidas Cup 1997, Prospecs Cup 1997 and League.

At that time, the attackers rarely scored against Kim Hak-chul. Hwang Sun-hong, Seo Jung-won, Kim Do-hoon etc.

References

External links 

1972 births
Living people
People from Gangneung
Association football defenders
South Korean footballers
Busan IPark players
Daegu FC players
Incheon United FC players
K League 1 players